Sir Charles Edward Ponsonby, 1st Baronet DL (2 September 1879 – 28 January 1976), was a British conservative politician who sat in the House of Commons from 1935 to 1950.

A member of the prominent Ponsonby family, he was the son of the Hon. Edwin Charles William Ponsonby, fifth son of Charles Ponsonby, 2nd Baron de Mauley, and Emily Dora Coope. He played cricket for Oxfordshire in the Minor Counties Championship from 1900 to 1903.

Ponsonby was elected Member of Parliament (MP) for Sevenoaks at the by-election there in 1935. He held the seat until the 1950 general election. He served as Parliamentary Private Secretary to the Foreign Secretary Anthony Eden from 1941 to 1945.

He was honorary Colonel of the Kent Yeomanry from 1942 to 1949. He gained the title of 1st Baronet Ponsonby of Wootton in 1956.

Ponsonby married Hon. Winifred Marian Gibbs, daughter of Herbert Gibbs, 1st Baron Hunsdon, and Anna Maria Durant, on 23 July 1912. They had four daughters and a son who succeeded to the baronetcy.

References

External links 
 

1879 births
1976 deaths
Charles Ponsonby, 1st Baronet, Sir
Conservative Party (UK) MPs for English constituencies
Baronets in the Baronetage of the United Kingdom
Deputy Lieutenants of Oxfordshire
UK MPs 1935–1945
UK MPs 1945–1950
English cricketers
Oxfordshire cricketers